The 2003 Citywest Irish Masters was a professional ranking snooker tournament that took place between 25 and 30 March 2003 at the Citywest Hotel in Dublin, Republic of Ireland.

Ronnie O'Sullivan won the title by defeating defending champion John Higgins 10–9 in the final.


Prize fund
The breakdown of prize money for this year is shown below:

Winner: £48,000
Final: £24,000
Semi-final: £11,500
Quarter-final: £7,525
Last 16: £6,600
Last 32: £5,600
Last 48: £3,000
Last 64: £2,300

Last 80: £1,600
Last 96: £800
Stage one highest break: £1,800
Stage two highest break: £7,500
Stage one maximum break: £5,000
Stage two maximum break: £20,000
Total: £400,000

Main draw

Final

Qualifying

Round 1 
Best of 9 frames

Round 2–5

Century breaks

Qualifying stage centuries

 129  Fergal O'Brien
 117  Matthew Couch
 116  Ricky Walden
 115  Tony Drago
 115  Jason Ferguson
 114  Lee Spick
 113, 108, 106  Paul Wykes
 112  Marco Fu

 110  Nick Dyson
 110  Jason Prince
 109, 104  Adrian Gunnell
 108  Robert Milkins
 107  Kristján Helgason
 105  Ryan Day
 102  Sean Storey
 100  Robin Hull

Televised stage centuries

 142  Peter Ebdon
 141  Mark Williams
 139  Stuart Bingham
 135  Joe Swail
 131, 123, 120, 110, 108, 104  John Higgins
 128, 128, 118, 106  Ronnie O'Sullivan
 125, 125, 108  Stephen Hendry

 120  Ali Carter
 118, 101  Paul Hunter
 118  Chris Small
 118  Matthew Stevens
 117  Anthony Hamilton
 117, 103  Dave Harold
 106  Alan McManus

Notes

References

Irish Masters
Irish Masters
Irish Masters
Irish Masters
Snooker ranking tournaments